House of Secrets may refer to:

 House of Secrets (DC Comics), several mystery-suspense, anthology comic book series published by DC Comics
 House of Secrets (Vertigo), an occult and horror-themed comic book series published by Vertigo
 The House of Secrets (novel), a 1926 novel by Sydney Horler
 The House of Secrets (1929 film), a 1929 American mystery film
 House of Secrets (1936 film), an American film
 House of Secrets (1956 film), a British film directed by Guy Green
 House of Secrets (album), a 2004 music album by OTEP
 House of Secrets (novel), a 2013 children's novel by Chris Columbus and Ned Vizzini